Kent Lex Baer (born May 2, 1951) is an American college football coach. He is the defensive coordinator at the University of Montana, a position he had held since 2018.  Baer served as the interim head football coach at the University of Notre Dame for one game in 2004 and at San Jose State University for one game in 2012.

Early life and college years
Born in Logan, Utah, Baer graduated from Sky View High School of Smithfield, Utah in 1969. Baer then enrolled at Utah State University. At Utah State, Baer lettered in football for four years (1969 through 1972) and graduated with a degree in physical education and recreation.

Coaching career
On December 1, 2004, Notre Dame defensive coordinator Baer was named interim head coach after regular head coach Tyrone Willingham was fired. Notre Dame eventually hired Charlie Weis as new head coach starting 2005. Baer was a 2002 finalist for the Broyles Award, given annually to the nation's top college football assistant coach. However, the Fighting Irish gave up 26.4 points per game in Baer's final 26 games on the coaching staff, from the 12th game of the 2002 season through the end of the 2004 season.

On January 3, 2005, after Willingham became head coach at Washington, Baer joined Willingham's staff as defensive coordinator.  At the conclusion of the 2007 season, after a statistically worst defensive season in UW football history, Willingham decided to let Baer go. In the three years at UW, the defense ranked 94, 95 and 98 in total defense, 89, 85 and 94 in scoring defense, and 106, 102 and 85 in passing defense.(1)

On April 14, 2008, Baer became defensive coordinator at San Jose State under Dick Tomey.

On December 11, 2012, Baer became interim head coach of San Jose State after Mike MacIntyre resigned to become head coach at Colorado. Baer coached the Spartans to a 29-20 victory over Bowling Green University in the 2012 Military Bowl on December 27. MacIntyre announced on December 18 that he would like Baer to join him in Colorado as defensive coordinator. With five other former San Jose State assistants, Baer joined MacIntyre in Colorado on January 3, 2013.

First year head coach Tony Sanchez completed his staff at UNLV when Baer joined on December 22, 2014 as his defensive coordinator and linebackers coach. Following the 2017 football season, Baer was relieved of his duties as defensive coordinator and linebackers coach at UNLV, allowing over 31 points per game and over 450 yards to opposing offenses.

Head coaching record

Notes

References

External links
 Montana profile

1951 births
Living people
American football linebackers
Arizona State Sun Devils football coaches
California Golden Bears football coaches
Colorado Buffaloes football coaches
Idaho Vandals football coaches
Montana Grizzlies football coaches
Notre Dame Fighting Irish football coaches
San Jose State Spartans football coaches
Stanford Cardinal football coaches
UNLV Rebels football coaches
Utah State Aggies football players
Washington Huskies football coaches
Sportspeople from Logan, Utah
Players of American football from Utah